William Alexander Bradford (born September 6, 1913), nicknamed "The Carbondale Flash", is an American former Negro league outfielder who played between 1938 and 1945.

A native of Madison, Alabama, Bradford made his Negro leagues debut in 1938 with the Indianapolis ABCs. He went on to play for the Memphis Red Sox and Chicago American Giants, and finished his career in 1945 with the Birmingham Black Barons.

References

External links
 and Seamheads

1913 births
Birmingham Black Barons players
Chicago American Giants players
Memphis Red Sox players
Indianapolis ABCs (1938) players
St. Louis Stars (1939) players
Baseball outfielders
Baseball players from Alabama
People from Madison, Alabama
Possibly living people